Saïd Chengriha (born 1 August 1945) is a senior official in the Algerian People's National Army. He was the commander of the ground forces and served as the army's interim chief of staff after the death of Ahmed Gaid Salah on 23 December 2019 until 3 July 2020 when he was officially appointed by President Abdelmadjid Tebboune.

Military service
After graduating from Saint-Cyr Military Academy, Chengriha took part in the Six-Day War in 1967 and the Yom Kippur War in 1973. He then attended the Voroshilov Academy. He has received a number of awards, including the Military Order of Merit. He was promoted to the rank of brigadier general in 1998 and then to major general in 2003. He became the commander of ground forces in September 2018 and was named acting chief of staff following the death of Ahmed Gaid Salah on 23 December 2019.

On 4 July 2022, Chengriha was promoted to the rank of Army general by president Tebboune, on the occasion of the 60th anniversary of the Algerian independence.

Personal life
Chengriha is married and has six children.

References

1945 births
People from Biskra Province
Algerian generals
Chaoui people
Living people
21st-century Algerian people